Luigi Nicolais (born 9 February 1942) is an Italian politician and academic, member of the Democratic Party and President of the National Research Council from 2012 to 2016.

Biography

Academic and research career
A chemical engineer, Nicolais graduated from the Faculty of Engineering of the University of Naples Federico II. Full professor of "Polymer Technologies" at the same University, as well as the author of over 350 scientific publications, he has been Director of the Institute for Composite Materials Technology of the National Research Council. He has also been a professor at the University of Washington and the University of Connecticut.

In 2012 he was appointed president of the National Research Council, replacing the new Minister of Education, University and Research of the Monti Cabinet Francesco Profumo and held the office for four years.

Political career
On 17 May 2006, Nicolais joined the second Prodi government as Minister for Reforms and Administrative Innovations and held the office for the whole 15th legislature.

A candidate in the 2008 political elections in the Campania 1 constituency among the Democratic Party lists, he was elected for a seat in the Chamber of Deputies. During the 16th legislature, Nicolais was a member and Vice-President of the 7th Commission for Culture, Science and Education of the Chamber of Deputies.

Formerly close to the positions of former President of Campania Antonio Bassolino, he was regional councilor with delegations to the University, scientific research and technological innovation to the Campania region from 2000 to 2005.

He is a candidate representing the centre-left coalition for the presidency of the province of Naples, but in the 2009 administrative elections he is beaten the centre-right candidate Luigi Cesaro.

References

1942 births
Living people
Democratic Party (Italy) politicians
Deputies of Legislature XVI of Italy